Little Reedness is a hamlet in the East Riding of Yorkshire, England.

Little Reedness forms part of the civil parish of Reedness.

References

Hamlets in the East Riding of Yorkshire